The 360 Degree Music Experience was an American band that performed both traditional and experimental jazz. Active during the 1970s and '80s, the group was initially co-led by drummer Beaver Harris and the pianist Dave Burrell. After Burrell left the group, pianist Don Pullen replaced him. Several other notable musicians were members of the band at one time or another, including Hamiet Bluiett, Cameron Brown, Ron Carter, Ricky Ford, Jimmy Garrison, Grachan Moncur III, Titos Sompa, and Buster Williams among others. The group released two albums for BMG: From Ragtime to No Time and A Well Kept Secret.

Discography
1976: In: Sanity (Black Saint)

References

1970s establishments in the United States
1980s disestablishments in the United States
American jazz ensembles
Musical groups established in the 1970s
Musical groups disestablished in the 1980s